Saint-Just-près-Brioude (literally Saint-Just near Brioude; Auvergnat: Sent Just de Briude) is a commune in the Haute-Loire department in south-central France.

Population

See also
Communes of the Haute-Loire department

References

Communes of Haute-Loire